Ebony Rolph (born 16 August 1994) is an Australian professional basketball player who plays for the Bendigo Spirit in the Women's National Basketball League.

Professional career

WNBL
Rolph made her professional debut with the Spirit in 2015. With the Spirit, she played alongside the likes of Kelsey Griffin, Gabrielle Richards and Kelly Wilson, coming off the bench. Rolph has been re-signed for the 2016–17 season.

Personal life
Rolph currently studies a Bachelor of Nursing/Psychology at Deakin University.

References

1994 births
Living people
Australian women's basketball players
Bendigo Spirit players
Sportswomen from Victoria (Australia)
Forwards (basketball)